The Westcott House is a Frank Lloyd Wright-designed Prairie Style house in Springfield, Ohio. The house was built in 1908 for Mr. Burton J. Westcott, his wife Orpha, and their family. The Westcott property is the only Prairie style house designed by Wright in the state of Ohio. The grounds include the main house and a garage with stables connected by an extensive pergola.

Early history
In 1903, as part of a merger, Burton J. Westcott came to Springfield, Ohio as Treasurer of The American Seeding Machine Company. He would hold the position for 21 years.

In 1916, Burton brought the Westcott Motor Car Company to Springfield, Ohio, from Richmond, Indiana. He was president of the company until 1925. Wright designed a detached garage which included a design for a large turntable (never installed), similar to at a railroad yard. The garage also included two pony stables and was connected to the main house by a pergola.

Burton's wife, Orpha, was from Hamilton, Ohio. The Westcotts had two children: Jeanne born in Richmond, Indiana, in 1895, and John born in Springfield, Ohio, in 1903. Orpha L. Westcott was considered one of Springfield, Ohio's most prominent and progressive women, and is credited with suggesting the selection of Frank Lloyd Wright as the architect for their new home.

In 1918, the Westcotts built the only addition to their home, a summer porch on the second floor and a room below in keeping with the original design of the Prairie style architecture of Frank Lloyd Wright. By 1920, Jennie was no longer living in the Westcott House; she married Richard Rodgers from Springfield, Ohio. Their wedding was held at the house. The only other residents of the house were a cook named Nora and a housemaid named Margaret, both middle-aged and originally from Ireland.

The 1920s proved to be unhappy years for the Westcott family. Orpha died suddenly in April 1923 following a minor surgical procedure in Philadelphia. At the same time Burton's company was failing. He resigned as treasurer of the American Seeding Machine Company in order to invest more time for the failing Westcott Motor Car Company. Attempts to save the ailing car company had exhausted his finances. With no other option Burton sold out. The severe stress in his life took its toll on his health. In 1926 at 57 years of age, he died in his home on East High Street while under the care of his sister from Richmond, Indiana. Funeral services were held at the Westcott residence; he was buried in Richmond, Indiana. Burton J. Westcott was a true leader, Renaissance man, innovator, and a manufacturing pioneer of the 20th century.

Following the death of Burton in 1926, the Westcott House was sold to Roscoe Pierce. He lived in the house until his death in 1941. Eva Linton bought the house in 1944. She subsequently sub-divided the main house into five apartments. Linton also had the stables remodeled, adding a kitchen and bathroom, and converted the garage into her place of residence. Over the next 37 years the house fell into a state of disrepair and decline. Eva Linton died in 1980, and her estate was passed to her niece Dorothy Jane Snyder. Dorothy inherited the property in 1981 and maintained it until 1988 when she sold it to her son Ken Snyder and his wife Sherri.

Westcott House Foundation
In 1991, Ken died unexpectedly in a car accident. Sherri struggled to manage and maintain the house until she sold the house in 2000. The Frank Lloyd Wright Building Conservancy acquired the decaying Westcott House from Mrs. Snyder for $300,000 through the use of their Lewis-Haines revolving loan program, and as part of the predefined purchase arrangement the house was subsequently sold on May 11, 2001, to the newly formed non-profit The Westcott House Foundation.

The Westcott House Foundation was organized by a devoted group of Springfield preservationists and benefactors, bolstered with a multi-year $3.5 million grant from the local Turner Foundation, they bought the house from the Conservancy and committed to restore the all-but-lost historic residence. Chambers, Murphy and Burge of Akron, Ohio, and Schooley Caldwell Associates of Columbus, Ohio, were secured to be the lead architectural firms for the project. The nearly 5-year, $5.8 million, restoration of the Westcott House was completed in 2005, and was governed by goals and objectives set forth by the Westcott House Foundation and the Frank Lloyd Wright Building Conservancy. More than four hundred architects, engineers, craftspeople and volunteers contributed to the effort. The Westcott House opened to the public on October 15, 2005.

As of 2019, the Westcott House Foundation sponsors a lecture series, an array of educational programs for student, adults and educators, design exhibits, immersive art/multi-media events, design workshops, and social activities. The foundation strives to promote a greater understanding of Frank Lloyd Wright architecture, particularly about Wright's concept of organic architecture, design process thinking, and design education. Guided tours are offered Wednesdays through Sundays.

References

 Storrer, William Allin. The Frank Lloyd Wright Companion. University of Chicago Press, 2006,  (S.099)

External links

Westcott House Foundation
Various Photos Of The Westcott House In Springfield, Ohio

Prairie School architecture in Ohio
Houses completed in 1908
Frank Lloyd Wright buildings
Houses on the National Register of Historic Places in Ohio
Historic house museums in Ohio
Museums in Clark County, Ohio
National Register of Historic Places in Clark County, Ohio
Buildings and structures in Springfield, Ohio
Houses in Clark County, Ohio
1908 establishments in Ohio